"Who's da Man" (styled as "Who's da' man") is a Swedish song performed by Elias, featuring Swedish singer Frans. The song was released as a digital download in Sweden on 17 May 2006. The song is dedicated to the Swedish football player Zlatan Ibrahimović. It is sung in the Scanian dialect of Swedish. The song was the biggest summer Swedish hit of 2006, staying at the top of the charts for 10 consecutive weeks. Elias and Frans also performed the song at Allsång på Skansen.

During June 2006, the song was played by the carillon in the Fredrik Church in Karlskrona three times every evening until Sweden was knocked out of the tournament.

Track listing

Charts and certifications

Weekly charts

Year-end charts

Certifications

Release history

References

External links 
Music video for "Who's da Man"

2006 singles
Swedish-language songs
Number-one singles in Sweden
Football songs and chants
Frans Jeppsson-Wall songs
2006 songs